Michael John Higgins OBE was an Anglican priest.

He was born on 31 December 1935, educated at Whitchurch Grammar School, Cardiff, the University of Birmingham and Gonville and Caius College, Cambridge. He was a lecturer in English Law at the University of Birmingham before preparing for ordination at Ridley Hall, Cambridge. He was a curate at Ormskirk Parish Church from 1965 to 1968 and then Selection Secretary for the Advisory Council for Church Ministry until 1974. He was Vicar of Frome and then Rector of Preston before his appointment as Dean of Ely in 1991, a post he held for 12 years.

References

1935 births
People educated at Whitchurch Grammar School, Cardiff
Alumni of the University of Birmingham
Academics of the University of Birmingham
Alumni of Gonville and Caius College, Cambridge
Deans of Ely
Officers of the Order of the British Empire
Living people